Following is a list of reference ranges for cerebrospinal fluid:

Ions and metals

Other molecules

Other CSF constituents

References

Clinical pathology